Citizen Kane: A Filmmaker’s Journey is a 2016 non-fiction book written by Harlan Lebo about the making of Citizen Kane, the motion picture produced, directed, co-written, and starring Orson Welles that is ranked by the American Film Institute as the best motion picture ever made.

Summary
Citizen Kane: A Filmmaker’s Journey describes Welles' rise to prominence, the creative control he received in his first Hollywood contract, studio infighting over the project at RKO Radio Pictures, the pressurized production schedule, the plot by the Hearst Corporation – critical of the similarity between real-life publisher William Randolph Hearst and the character of Charles Foster Kane – to suppress or destroy the film and discredit Welles, and the ascent of Citizen Kane in the rankings of American motion pictures.

The book is notable for using previously unused documents from the Hearst and Welles archives, the University of Michigan, and the Museum of Modern Art (New York), to examine six new topics about the film: Welles' role in writing the screenplay, which was larger than formerly understood; previously-unreleased information provided by Welles’ assistant Kathryn (Trosper) Popper, which describes Welles’ struggles with creating the film; the impact on the production of a previously-unexplored script that Welles created after the studio approved a final draft; eyewitness accounts of last-second writing by Welles; new scenes written during production to fix flaws in the story; and information about the plans by the Hearst organization to suppress or destroy Citizen Kane and discredit Welles.

Reception
Citizen Kane: A Filmmaker’s Journey received consistently positive reviews, with critics citing the book for its comprehensive narrative, clarifying misconceptions and inaccuracies, and new factual information about the film.

Kirkus Reviews reported, "Citizen Kane: A Filmmaker's Journey is everything you wanted to know about the greatest film of all time – and then some." Although The New York Times review said although the book seemed “quaint” when compared to the biography by Simon Callow on Orson Welles’ middle years that was published the same month, The Times also said that Lebo’s book was “The most thorough account yet of the genesis, production, and release of Welles's most famous film. . .it's never been presented this comprehensively.”

See also
 Citizen Kane
 Screenplay for Citizen Kane
 Sources for Citizen Kane
  TheGuardian.com: Scale of Hearst plot to discredit Orson Welles and Citizen Kane revealed

Notes

References

2016 non-fiction books
Books about individual films
Citizen Kane
Thomas Dunne Books books